Anti-Georgian sentiment, also known as Kartvelophobia, refers to the dislike, hatred, or persecution of Georgians, the country of Georgia, or Georgian culture.

Armenia
According to a July 2007 poll in Armenia, Georgia was viewed as a political and economic threat by 12% of respondents, while 9% viewed it as an important partner. According to a 2013 poll, a majority of respondents opposed women marrying Georgians (70% disapproving vs 29% approving). In contrast, a majority approved doing business with Georgians (67% vs 31%).

Azerbaijan
According to a 2013 poll, a majority of respondents in Azerbaijan opposed women marrying Georgians (94% disapproving vs 5% approving). In contrast, a majority approved doing business with Georgians (78% vs 20%).

Iran
The statue of word Allah made by Iranian Georgians from the Georgian Mkhedruli letters was to be installed in a square in Fereydunshahr, Iran. On the first installation attempt, the statue was not installed because of opposition from the Lurs. 120 days later, it was installed, but only for a few hours at night, then taken down and moved out of the city.

Russia

According to the Russian-based human rights center Memorial as of 2006 "Georgian citizens or just ethnic Georgian are subject to unlawful mass checks of observance of regime of sojourn" in Russia. The atmosphere of fear for Georgians in Russia was "supported by a lot of anti-Georgian materials in mass media, first of all on TV." 

It especially intensified during and after the Russo-Georgian War of 2008. In the months following the war, discrimination against Georgian residents in Russia ran high. Svante Cornell and S. Frederick Starr described the situation as follows:

By early October 2008, the "anti-Georgian campaign had turned into a full-scale witch hunt". Sanctions against Georgia were passed by the State Duma, while visas for Georgian citizens were shortened by half. Temur Iakobashvili, Georgia's State Minister for Reintegration, accused Russia of financially backing an anti-Georgian campaign in the Western media. After change of leadership in Georgia in 2012-2013, when Georgian Dream replaced Saakashvili's UNM, "Moscow’s anti-Georgian rhetoric has softened as the strong ideological opposition frequently raised by the previous Georgian government has disappeared, and Russia has lifted its previous embargoes on Georgian wines and mineral water."

In 2012, then-Prime Minister Vladimir Putin, at a dinner with journalists, said that Boris Akunin, a popular fiction writer in Russia, supports the Russian opposition just because "he's an ethnic Georgian".

In August 2008 opposition activist Aleksei Navalny referred to Georgians by as "rodents." Navalny later apologized, but said that "he stands by the other positions he took at that time."

Russian movies Olympus Inferno (2008) and August Eighth (2012) carry anti-Georgian sentiments.

Abkhazia

Anti-Georgian and anti-Soviet riots took place in Abkhazia during the Soviet period in 1957, 1967, and 1979. Reports of these incidents were largely suppressed until the late 1980s.

During the 1992–93 war the ethnic Georgians were victims of ethnic cleansing by the Abkhaz separatist government.

South Ossetia
During 2008 Russo-Georgian war, Ethnic cleansing of Georgians in South Ossetia took place conducted by the "South Ossetian" separatists and Russian forces in occupied territory of Tskhinvali region, also known as South Ossetia.

References

 
Society of Georgia (country)
Georgian